The Broad was an English coin worth 20 shillings (20/-) issued by the Commonwealth of England in 1656. It was a milled gold coin weighing 9.0–9.1 grams, with a diameter of 29 or 30 millimetres, designed by Thomas Simon (also called Symonds).

The obverse of the coin depicts the Lord Protector Oliver Cromwell as a laureated Roman emperor, with the Latin inscription OLIVAR D G R P ANG SCO HIB &c PRO [Olivarius Res Publicae Angliae, Scotiae et Hiberniae etc. Protector] — Oliver, by the Grace of God, of the Republic of England, Scotland, Ireland etc., Protector, while the reverse shows a crowned shield depicting the arms of the Commonwealth with the inscription PAX QVAERITVR BELLO 1656 -- Peace is sought through war.

The current value of the coin in "very fine" to "extremely fine" condition is £3,500 to £6,000 as the pieces are very rare, but normally fairly unworn, although a Mr Pinkerton, writing at the time that the coins circulated, noted that many of the coins in circulation were so worn as to be almost flat.

A piedfort version of the coin with an edge inscription is known as a Fifty shilling piece. This is extremely rare, and there are very few examples as it is probably a pattern.

External links

 Oliver Cromwell broad

English gold coins
1656 in England
Oliver Cromwell
Interregnum (England)
1650s economic history